The Happy Day is a 1949 picture book written by Ruth Krauss and illustrated by Marc Simont. In the book woodland creatures awake to find that it is spring. The book was a recipient of a 1949 Caldecott Honor for its illustrations.

References

1949 children's books
American picture books
Caldecott Honor-winning works
Harper & Brothers books